Caroline Finkelstein (born New York City, April, 1940, died Atlanta, February, 2016) was an American poet.

Life

Finkelstein was the second child of Louis and Rasha (Rae) Shapiro, clothing merchants in Manhattan. Her brother, David I. Shapiro, became a noted Washington lawyer. As a girl, Finkelstein led what she calls “a bifurcated life, half American, half some idea of upper bourgeois European society....This upbringing maintains itself in many of my poems as mood, or attitude, or actual subject matter.”

She was married at nineteen to Jack Finkelstein, a pediatric neurologist. They had three children: Adam, Gabriel, and Nicholas. She divorced in 1977 and later married the poet Robert Clinton, whom she also divorced.

Having dropped out of Barnard College after one term, she earned an M.F.A. at Goddard College, where she studied with Ellen Bryant Voigt, Robert Hass, and Michael Ryan. She was at Yaddo and the MacDowell Colony.

Finkelstein grew up on Central Park West. After her marriage she moved to Philadelphia, then back to the Upper West Side, then to Fort Worth, Texas, then back to the Upper West Side, then to Millerton, New York. After her first divorce she lived in Middlesex, Vermont and Rochester, Massachusetts. In 1982, 2001, 2003 she lived in Westport, Massachusetts. In 1999 and 2000, she lived in Florence and traveled around Italy.

In Vermont she became good friends with Donald Hall. She visited Jane Kenyon shortly before her death.

She has published her work in Poetry, The Gettysburg Review, Fence, The Paris Review, Seneca Review, New American Writing, and The American Poetry Review.

She last lived in Roswell, Georgia.

Awards
 Two fellowships from the National Endowment for the Arts
 Massachusetts Cultural Council and the Vermont Arts Council grants
 1999 Amy Lowell Poetry Travelling Scholarship
 Fellow at the MacDowell Colony

Works

Poetry Books
 
 
 
 The Moment.

Ploughshares

Quotes
About her poem "Conjecture Number One Thousand", Finkelstein wrote: “I wrote [the poem] while I was a fellow at the MacDowell Colony. It’s a rueful comment on my second marriage and an attempt at checking the longing that lives in my memories. The irony and occasional flippancy replicate much of the marriage’s shape. Being at MacDowell, where my former husband and I had once attended, only heightened the senses of loss and comedy within that loss.”

References

2016 deaths
Goddard College alumni
American women poets
People from Roswell, Georgia
Poets from Georgia (U.S. state)
1940 births
21st-century American women